Bas Kutuku (also Romanized as Bas Kūtūkū; also known as Bast Kūtak) is a village in Kuhak Rural District, in the Central District of Jahrom County, Fars Province, Iran. As of the 2006 census, its population was 20, in 5 families.

References 

Populated places in Jahrom County